Gert Kullamäe (born 3 June 1971) is an Estonian basketball coach and a former professional basketball player who currently coaches Estonian team BC Pärnu Sadam. Kullamäe mostly played at the shooting guard position and was a great 3-point shooter. As a player he is a seven-time Estonian Champion and also a Soviet Union, Lithuanian, Belgian and Dutch champion.

Club career
Kullamäe was born in Tallinn, Estonia, and made his senior club debut with TPI (Tallinn University of Technology) team in Estonian SSR Championship (today Korvpalli Meistriliiga). This happened in autumn 1985 when he was only 14 years and 4 months old. After some seasons, he signed with Kalev and he has played in USSR Championships; Korać Cup in 1990–91 and FIBA European Champions Cup in 1991–92. During this period Kullamäe won USSR Championship in 1991 and Estonian Championships in 1992 and 1993. Then he moved to Lithuanian BC Zalgiris and won the Lithuanian Championship in 1994. In Lithuania he was coached by Jaak Salumets, ex-coach of Tallinn "Kalev" and the Estonia national basketball team. After a successful season with the Lithuanian club Kullamäe came back to Estonia and played for Kalev and "Kamee" teams in Meistriliiga. He won the Estonian Championships again in 1995 and 1998. Eurobasket.com voted him a Meistriliiga MVP in 1998; 1999; 2000. Kullamäe signed a contract with Telindus Oostende in 2000–01 season and won the Belgian League with the team. After a serious knee injury and one season in an Estonian team "BC Hotronic" he moved back to Europe. Kullamäe signed to a Bundesliga team Brose Baskets. With this team he won two German Championships silver medals and then moved to EiffelTowers. Kullamäe was voted Dutch Eredivisie All-Bosman Player of the Year in 2005 and 2006, he also won the Dutch Championship in 2006. In summer of 2006 Kullamäe came back to Estonia and joined Tartu Ülikool/Rock. In 2007 and 2008 he won his 5th and 6th Estonian Championship title with Tartu team. He has also finished Baltic Basketball League on third place in 2008–09 season with Rock.

Coaching
In July 2009 he announced his retirement from active career and became an assistant coach in Tartu Rock. Kullamäe became head coach of Tartu in January 2012 after Indrek Visnapuu resigned. Kullamäe left Tartu after the team missed out of the 2017 Estonian League finals. In January 2018 he became the head coach of Tallinna Kalev/TLÜ. Kullamäe resigned in January 2019 due to a disagreement with the club management. In May 2019 he became the head coach of TalTech. He resigned in December 2019 and became the assistant coach of BC Pärnu Sadam in February 2020. In November 2022 he became the head coach of BC Pärnu Sadam.

National team career
In the late 1980s, Kullamäe was a member of the U-17 USSR Basketball team (coached by Modestas Paulauskas) and the U-19 USSR Basketball team (coached by Stanislav Eremin). He won a bronze medal with the USSR team at the FIBA Europe Under-16 Championship in 1987. Kullamäe was a member of Estonia national basketball team between 1993 and 1995, 1998 and 2001, and in 2004 and 2007 (when he served as captain). His national team career-high score was 32 points, which was obtained during a match against Lithuania in autumn 1994, as part of the EuroBasket 1995 qualifying round. Kullamäe was also a member of the Estonian EuroBasket 1993 squad.

Season by season results as head coach
Abbreviations:QF; quarter-finals.T16; top sixteen.L32; last 32.RS; regular season.QR2; qualification round 2.

Honours

Orders 
 Order of the White Star, 5th Class: 2010

References

External links
 Profile at basket.ee 
 Profile at bbl.net
 German Fansite

1971 births
Living people
BC Žalgiris players
BC Oostende players
Brose Bamberg players
Estonian basketball coaches
Estonian men's basketball players
Estonian expatriate basketball people in Belgium
Estonian expatriate basketball people in Germany
Estonian expatriate basketball people in Lithuania
Estonian expatriate basketball people in the Netherlands
Korvpalli Meistriliiga players
Heroes Den Bosch players
Tallinn University of Technology alumni
Tartu Ülikool/Rock players
Soviet men's basketball players
Basketball players from Tallinn
Recipients of the Order of the White Star, 5th Class
Small forwards
Shooting guards
KK Kalev players